The Adams Street station was a station on the demolished BMT Myrtle Avenue Line and BMT Lexington Avenue Line in Brooklyn, New York City. It had 2 tracks and 2 side platforms. It was opened on February 13, 1888, as "City Hall Station" and closed on March 5, 1944. The next stop to the north was Bridge–Jay Streets. The next stop to the south was Sands Street.

References

External links
Adams Street MJ Line (NYCSubway.org)
Last Days of the Myrtle Avenue El (Forgotten New York.com)

Defunct BMT Myrtle Avenue Line stations
Former elevated and subway stations in Brooklyn
Railway stations in the United States opened in 1888
Railway stations closed in 1944
1888 establishments in New York (state)
1944 disestablishments in New York (state)